These are the official results of the Women's Discus Throw event at the 1983 World Championships in Helsinki, Finland. There were a total of 21 participating athletes, with the final held on Sunday August 14, 1983.

Medalists

Schedule
All times are Eastern European Time (UTC+2)

Abbreviations
All results shown are in metres

Records

Qualification

Group A

Group B

Final

See also
 1980 Women's Olympic Discus Throw (Moscow)
 1982 Women's European Championships Discus Throw (Athens)
 1984 Women's Olympic Discus Throw (Los Angeles)
 1986 Women's European Championships Discus Throw (Stuttgart)

References
 Results

D
Discus throw at the World Athletics Championships
1983 in women's athletics